Reena Aggarwal is an Indian actress and model who has appeared in feature films, television series and theatre productions.

Acting and modeling career

Reena Aggarwal made her television debut with the Disney Channel India show Kya Mast Hai Life in 2009. She then acted in the Marathi film Ajintha in 2012, directed by Nitin Desai, as the second female lead. She also made her Bollywood debut with  Talaash: The Answer Lies Within in 2012. She played the role of Savita, a female police constable, in the film. After that, she was seen in the &TV show Agent Raghav - Crime Branch as the Forensic Doctor Aarti Mistry. Her Marathi film Zhalla Bobhata was released on 6 January 2017.  Her later films are Behen Hogi Teri (Hindi) and Dev Devharyat Nahi (Marathi). She has also acted in dramas and stage shows. Her acclaimed theatre drama performances include Mazi Bayko Mazi Mehuni in Marathi and Krishnapriya in Hindi.  She also appeared in the promotional advertisement Kon Hoeel Marathi Crorepati 3 and the music video Rang Priticha. In 2018, Aggarwal had a role in the film 31 Divas.

Filmography

Films

Television

References

External links

Year of birth missing (living people)
Living people
Indian television actresses
Actresses in Hindi cinema
Indian film actresses
Marathi actors
Actresses in Marathi cinema
Actresses from Mumbai
People from Pune